DWCZ (94.7 FM), broadcasting as 94.7 Spirit FM, is a radio station owned and operated by Diocesan Multimedia Services, Inc., the media arm of the Diocese of Legazpi. Its studio and transmitter is located at the 2nd Floor DMSI HUB (Old St. 
Jude Catholic School Compound), Sol's Subdivision Brgy. Bitano, Legazpi, Albay. It is the only FM station in Albay and the only CMN Spirit station airing a Top 40 format.

References

Radio stations in Legazpi, Albay
DWCZ
Contemporary hit radio stations in the Philippines